Seioptera is a genus of picture-winged flies in the family Ulidiidae.

Species
 Seioptera albipes
 Seioptera colon
 Seioptera costalis
 Seioptera demonstrans
 Seioptera dubiosa
 Seioptera importans

References

 
Tephritoidea genera